Wee 3 is a Canadian preschool television series aired on Treehouse TV and Radio-Canada. It first aired on January 30, 2001 with a total of 27 27-minute episodes, along with Treetown, Ants in Your Pants and Crazy Quilt. It also formerly aired as an acquired series on YTV.

The show also aired new episodes on Treehouse TV and Radio-Canada from January 30, 2001 to June 15, 2002, and repeated episodes from June 16, 2002 until February 27, 2011 like some of the other late night programs formerly aired.

It centers the friendship and adventures of three, four-year-old anthropomorphic toy monsters, Bunwin, Creakie and Pook, come out from hiding in a young child's bedroom and play games. However, they come out only when the child is absent. They work out their fears by playing fantasy adventures targeted towards children ages three to seven-years old.

Characters
The following is a list of characters appearing on Wee 3. Cheep Cheep, Magic Racer and Dolly were shown as toy characters.

Original characters

Main characters 
 Bunwin is the small orange monster. She is puppeteered by Mandi Lester and voiced by Jane Miller (season 1) and Dana Glickman (season 2).
 Pook is the tall purple monster and is puppeteered by Gerard Lizaire and is voiced by Jeff Sweeney. He likes jellybeans a lot.
 Creakie is the medium blue monster and is puppeteered by Jay Daniels and was voiced by Ruth Barrett.

Inanimate, minor and supporting characters 
 Cheep Cheep is a tiny yellow toy chick.
 Magic Racer is a green toy dinosaur.
 Dolly 1 is a tan skin doll with pigtails.
 Dolly 2 is a blue doll with long hair.

Episodes

Series overview

Season 1 (2001) 
 This season has 16 episodes.
 This season is the only season directed by Lorraine Barton.

Season 2 (2002) 

 This season has 11 episodes.
 Bunwin is now voiced by Dana Glickman in this season, and episodes are directed by Steven Wright in this season.

References

Treehouse TV original programming
2000s Canadian children's television series
2000s Canadian comedy television series
2000s Canadian music television series
2001 Canadian television series debuts
2002 Canadian television series endings
Canadian television shows featuring puppetry
YTV (Canadian TV channel) original programming
Canadian children's comedy television series
Canadian children's fantasy television series
Canadian children's musical television series
Canadian preschool education television series
2000s preschool education television series
Television series about children
Television series about monsters
Sentient toys in fiction
Television series by Corus Entertainment
Ici Radio-Canada Télé original programming